Judas is a 2004 Biblical television drama film depicting the intertwined lives of Judas Iscariot and Jesus of Nazareth. The story depicts Judas as having sympathetic motives, desiring to free the Jewish people from Roman rule. It was shot in Ouarzazate, Morocco.

The film was originally slated to be titled, Judas and Jesus, One source stated of the film that "The ABC television network tried to cash in on the craze for The Passion of the Christ". The film "focuses on Judas himself with Jesus being a significant being a significant presence but having more of a supporting role".

Plot
Judas meets Jesus and at first does not know what to make of him or whether or not to trust him. A cynical city boy, Judas makes fun of the country bumpkin disciples who follow Jesus but eventually decides to join the band, as well.

He and Jesus become good friends, even though they often see things very differently. Ultimately, Judas is convinced that Jesus needs to use his popularity and wonder-working powers to free the Jews from the Romans, and Jesus sees a larger, spiritual perspective.  As a friend, Judas convinces Jesus to give his disciples his miraculous powers, and he does with good results.

Finally, the Jewish leaders spy on Judas and convince him of the greater good of betraying Jesus, in order to save the Jewish people. Judas gets caught between the corrupt leaders Caiaphas and Pontius Pilate and Jesus.

Cast

 Johnathon Schaech as Judas Iscariot
 Jonathan Scarfe as Jesus of Nazareth 
 Tim Matheson as Pontius Pilate
 Fiona Glascott as Claudia Procles
 Owen Teale as Flavius
 Bob Gunton as Caiaphas
 Mark Womack as Peter
 Rory Kinnear as Andrew
 Enzo Squillino Jr. as James 
 Harry Peacock as John
 Paul Haigh as Matthew
 Georgia Mackenzie as Mary Magdalene 
 Aidan McArdle as John the Baptist
 Diane Keen as Mary, Mother of Jesus
 Philip Dunbar as Herod
 Aziz El Hattab as Bartholomew
 Hicham Bahloul as Thomas 
 Hasna Tamtaoui as Martha
 Fatiha Quatili as Mary of Bethany
 Housseine Dejjiti as Lazarus
 Mohamed Khayi as Jemes
 Omar Lahlou as Simon

See also

 2004 in American television
 List of foreign films shot in Morocco

References

External links
 

2000s biographical films
2004 drama films
2004 television films
2004 films
American biographical films
American Broadcasting Company original programming
Films shot in Morocco
Paramount Pictures films
Portrayals of Jesus in film
Cultural depictions of John the Baptist
Portrayals of the Virgin Mary in film
Films directed by Charles Robert Carner
Cultural depictions of Judas Iscariot
Cultural depictions of Pontius Pilate
Portrayals of Mary Magdalene in film
Cultural depictions of Saint Peter
2000s American films